The Sound of Scars is the sixth studio album by American alternative metal band Life of Agony. It was released on October 11, 2019, through Napalm Records and is the band's first release with drummer Veronica Bellino.

The Sound of Scars is a concept album dealing with issues related to trauma recovery and healing. It is a sequel to the story told on the band's debut album, River Runs Red.

Documentary
A documentary film, also titled The Sound of Scars, was released April 16, 2021. The film was directed by Leigh Brooks and includes interviews with the band members and their families. The film also includes archival footage, photographs, lost interviews, and goes over various points of the band's history, particularly Mina Caputo's gender transition.

Track listing

Reception

The Sound of Scars has received positive critical reviews since its release.

Dom Lawson of Blabbermouth.net praised Caputo's vocals, saying "Caputo sings every last word as if teetering on the edge of desperation, a remorseless blaze of passion and charisma that carries these songs far beyond their initial potential." Lawson also praised the band's musicianship and said the album "is a welcome display of class and power from some perennially unsung champions." Jon Hadusek of Consequence of Sound praised the album's story line, Caputo's vocals, and mixing of genres, but said the more straightforward hardcore parts were the album's weakest moments. Hadusek said the album is a worthy successor to River Runs Red.

Personnel

Life of Agony
Mina Caputo – lead vocals
Joey Z – guitar, backing vocals, engineer, producer
Alan Robert – bass, backing vocals, creative director
Veronica Bellino – drums

Additional musicians
Morgan O. Shaughnessey – strings

Production
Sylvia Massy – mixing, producer
Howie Weinberg – mastering
Gino Depinto – photography

Voices
Toni Caputo
Nelson Faro Decastro
Giana Goldstein
Brian Hyland
Elias Mansourati
Kyle Nichols
Dori Ann Scagnelli
Frank Sileo
Christine Zagami
Mia Zampella
Sofia Zampella

References

2019 albums
Life of Agony albums
Napalm Records albums
Concept albums